Charles Wallace Ziegler (January 13, 1875 – April 18, 1904) was a professional baseball infielder. He played parts of two seasons in Major League Baseball for the Cleveland Spiders and Philadelphia Phillies.

References

External links

Major League Baseball infielders
Cleveland Spiders players
Philadelphia Phillies players
Dubuque Tigers players
Chatham Reds players
Wheeling Stogies players
Grand Rapids Furniture Makers players
Springfield Wanderers players
Columbus Senators players
Albany Senators players
Syracuse Stars (minor league baseball) players
Seattle Clamdiggers players
Portland Webfoots players
Helena Senators players
Seattle Siwashes players
Baseball players from Canton, Ohio
1875 births
1904 deaths
19th-century baseball players